During the 2019–20 season, Málaga CF participated in Segunda División and the Copa del Rey. The season covered the period from 1 July 2019 to 20 July 2020.

Current squad

Reserve team

Out on loan

Transfers

In

Total spending:  €0

Out

Total  income :  €0

Pre-season and friendlies

Competitions

Overview

Segunda División

League table

Results summary

Results by round

Matches
The fixtures were revealed on 4 July 2019.

Copa del Rey

First round

Statistics

Appearances and goals
Last updated on 20 July 2020.

|-
! colspan=10 style=background:#dcdcdc; text-align:center|Goalkeepers

|-
! colspan=10 style=background:#dcdcdc; text-align:center|Defenders

|-
! colspan=14 style=background:#dcdcdc; text-align:center|Midfielders

|-
! colspan=14 style=background:#dcdcdc; text-align:center|Forwards

|-
! colspan=14 style=background:#dcdcdc; text-align:center| Players who have made an appearance or had a squad number this season but have left the club

|-
|}

References

Málaga CF seasons
Málaga